Oka V Chitram (styled Oka 'V' Chitram) is a 2006 Indian  Telugu-language comedy film written and directed by Teja, and produced by Dasari Narayana Rao and Siri Media Pvt Ltd. It stars Aadhi Pinisetty, Vamsi Krishna and Madhu Shalini. The music was composed by Sri Murali. The film is inspired by the American film, Bowfinger. Aadhi Pinisetty made his debut in the film under the name Pradeep Pinisetty.

Cast 

 Aadhi Pinisetty as P. Balaram
 Vamsi Krishna as Santosh Babu
 Madhu Shalini as Supraja
 Poonam Kaur as Deepa
 Pooja Bharti as Supriya
 Tanikella Bharani as Devam
 Krishna Bhagavaan as Cameraman Krishna Krishna
 Telangana Shakuntala as Lakshmamma
 Satyam Rajesh as Free Free, a poet
 Madhunandan as Microsoft
 Raghu Babu as PP Pulla Rao
 Srinivasa Reddy as Balaram's friend Mahi
 M. S. Narayana as Dr. Gasagasa Rao
 Duvvasi Mohan as Head Constable
 Ravi Prakash as Supraja's husband
 Rallapalli as Balaram's boss
 Bharath Reddy as Bharath
 Kondavalasa Lakshmana Rao
 Lakshmipathi as Saloon Samba
 Jeeva as Costume shop owner
 Ambati Srinivas as Watchman
 Jayavani as Supriya's mother
 Banerjee as Police Officer
 Ahuti Prasad as Santosh Babu's lawyer
 Bandla Ganesh as Santosh Babu's driver

Soundtrack
Music composed by Sri Murali. The song “Amigo” was screened at the Visual Effects Society Festival.

Release  
The Hindu and Full Hyderabad gave negative reviews.

References

External links

Indian satirical films
Films about filmmaking
Films directed by Teja (film director)
2000s Telugu-language films